The Square Paul-Gilot is a garden square in the Saint-Lambert and Javel quarters in the 15th arrondissement of Paris, France.

Location 
The garden square can also be reached from Rue Sébastien-Mercier.

It is served by the station Javel–André Citroën of the Métro Line 10.

History 
The garden square was established in 1926. It was left to the Paris city council by the mother of Paul Gilot (1888–1938), an engineer of the Compagnie des glaces et verres spéciaux de France, after whom the street was named.

Features 
The garden has a small pagoda-like pavilion.

References 

Gardens in Paris
Parks and open spaces in Paris
15th arrondissement of Paris
1926 establishments in France